World of Joy is the second and final studio album released by the American indie rock band Howler on March 24, 2014, through Rough Trade.

Background 
World of Joy was recorded at the Terrarium in Minneapolis with America Give Up producer Chris Heidman. Some noted influences are The Byrds and Hüsker Dü. The band showcased a number of songs off the album during 89.3 The Current's 9th birthday party a First Avenue on January, 25th, 2014. It is the band's first and only album with drummer Rory MacMurdo.

Track listing

Personnel
Jordan Gatesmith - Lead Guitar, Vocals, Bass, Drums 
Ian Nygaard - Guitar, Sitar, Vocals 
Max Petrek - Bass, Keyboard
Rory MacMurdo - Drums

References

2014 albums
Howler (band) albums
Rough Trade Records albums